Heliconia aurantiaca is a species of flowering plant in the family Heliconiaceae. It is endemic to Central America - south Mexico and Guatemala. Its natural habitat are montane forests.

References

External links
 Heliconia aurantica observations on iNaturalist

aurantiaca